Tours4fun is an online travel booking website where travelers can book vacation packages, hotels, cruises, tours and activities. The company partners with local and international tour and travel suppliers worldwide. The website also offers an interactive travel companion forum, travelers reviews and photos.

History
Tours4fun was founded in May 2006. In December 2013, Chinese travel giant Ctrip purchased Tours4fun for more than $100 million in order to form the basis of its North American expansion. In April 2014, Tours4fun started to offer cruises and in 2015, added the ability for customers to instantly book travel services.

Pack for a Purpose 
In December 2015, the company partnered with the non-profit organization Pack for a Purpose to promote ethical and responsible travel and inform travelers of charity foundations near their destinations.

References

External links 

Trip.com Group
American travel websites
American companies established in 2006
Transport companies established in 2006
Internet properties established in 2006
2013 mergers and acquisitions
Online travel agencies
Companies based in California